Dalma Sebestyén (born 23 January 1997) is a Hungarian swimmer. She competed in the women's 200 metre breaststroke event at the 2016 Summer Olympics.

In 2014, she represented Hungary at the 2014 Summer Youth Olympics held in Nanjing, China.

References

External links
 

1997 births
Living people
Hungarian female swimmers
Olympic swimmers of Hungary
Swimmers at the 2016 Summer Olympics
Sportspeople from Székesfehérvár
Swimmers at the 2014 Summer Youth Olympics
Hungarian female breaststroke swimmers
Swimmers at the 2020 Summer Olympics
21st-century Hungarian women